Cossonus is a weevil genus.

Species include:

 Cossonus americanus Buchanan, 1936
 Cossonus corticola Say, 1831
 Cossonus crenatus Horn, 1873
 Cossonus ellipticollis Van Dyke, 1915
 Cossonus fossicollis Van Dyke, 1916
 Cossonus hamiltoni Slosson, 1899
 Cossonus hubbardi Schwarz, 1899
 Cossonus impressifrons Boheman, 1838
 Cossonus impressus Boheman, 1838
 Cossonus linearis
 Cossonus lupini Van Dyke, 1915
 Cossonus marginalis
 Cossonus murrayi (Wollaston, 1874)
 Cossonus pacificus Van Dyke, 1916
 Cossonus parallelepipedus
 Cossonus piniphilus Boheman, 1838
 Cossonus platalea Say, 1831
 Cossonus ponderosae Van Dyke, 1915
 Cossonus quadricollis Van Dyke, 1915
 Cossonus rufipennis Buchanan, 1936
 Cossonus schwarzi Van Dyke, 1916
 Cossonus spathula Boheman, 1838
 Cossonus texanus Van Dyke, 1915

References 

Cossoninae
Curculionidae genera